Asia Artist Awards (abbreviated AAA) is an awards ceremony organized by South Korea-based business newspaper Money Today and its global media brands StarNews and MTN. This honors the outstanding achievements and international contributions of Asian artists in television, film and music. The inaugural ceremony was held on November 16, 2016, at Kyung Hee University's Hall of Peace in Seoul, and was broadcast live via satellite across Asia.

The 6th edition of the awards ceremony took place on December 2, 2021 at KBS Arena, Seoul. It was hosted by Leeteuk and Jang Won-young.

Ceremonies

Winners

Grand Prize (Daesang)

Rookie of the Year

Popularity Award 
(Determined through fan votes)

Asia Celebrity

Best Artist Award

Best Icon Award

Best OST Award

Fabulous Award

Focus Award

New Wave Award

Best Actor Award

Best Creator Award

Best Emotive Award

Best History of Songs Award

Best Musician Award

Best Producer Award

Best Choice Award

Hot Trend Award

Potential Award

AAA Scene Stealer

AAA Top of Kpop Record

AAA Best Achievement Award

AAA Best of Best Starnews Choeaedol Popularity Award

AAA Hot Issue Award

Best Acting Award

Best Music Video Award

Best Pop Artist Award

Discontinued awards

AAA X Dongnam Media & FPT Polytechnic Popularity

Best Vietnamese Artist

Best Popular Award

Best Social Award

AAA Best K-Culture

Asia Star Award

Best Celebrity Award

Best Entertainer Award

Best Welcome Award

Brilliant Award

Best Star Award

Rising Award

Eco Creator Award

Legend Award

Favorite Award

Samsung Pay Award

Rising Star Award

Asia Icon

Baidu Star Award

Korean Tourism Appreciation Award

Asia Hot Artist

Best Music Award

AAA Groove

Best Performance Director

Artist of the Year

Most wins

See also

List of Asian television awards

References

External links
 
2016 Asia Artist Awards Winner  
2017 Asia Artist Awards Winner  
2018 Asia Artist Awards Winner  
2019 Asia Artist Awards Winner  

Awards established in 2016
2016 establishments in South Korea
South Korean music awards
South Korean television awards
Annual events in South Korea